John Elvis Miller (May 15, 1888 – January 30, 1981) was a United States representative and United States Senator from Arkansas and later was a United States district judge of the United States District Court for the Western District of Arkansas.

Education and career

Born on May 15, 1888, in Aid, Stoddard County, Missouri, Miller attended the public schools, Southeast Missouri State Teachers College (now Southeast Missouri State University) and Valparaiso University. He received a Bachelor of Laws in 1912 from the University of Kentucky College of Law and was admitted to the bar the same year. He entered private practice in Searcy, Arkansas from 1912 to 1919 and also engaged in banking. He was a delegate to the Arkansas state constitutional convention in 1918. He was a prosecutor for the First Judicial Circuit of Arkansas from 1919 to 1922.

Congressional service

Miller was elected as a Democrat to the United States House of Representatives of the 72nd United States Congress and to the three succeeding Congresses and served from March 4, 1931, to November 14, 1937, when he resigned to become a United States senator.

He was elected on October 18, 1937, as a Democrat to the United States Senate to fill the vacancy caused by the death of United States Senator Joseph Taylor Robinson for the term ending January 3, 1943, and served from November 15, 1937, until his resignation effective March 31, 1941, to assume a federal judicial post.

Federal judicial service

Miller was nominated by President Franklin D. Roosevelt on January 31, 1941, to a seat on the United States District Court for the Western District of Arkansas vacated by Judge Heartsill Ragon. He was confirmed by the United States Senate on January 31, 1941, and received his commission on March 12, 1941. He served as Chief Judge from 1958 to 1967 and as a member of the Judicial Conference of the United States from 1962 to 1963. He assumed senior status on February 28, 1967. His service terminated on January 30, 1981, due to his death in Little Rock, Arkansas. At the time of his death, he resided in Fort Smith, Sebastian County, Arkansas. He was interred in Forest Park Cemetery.

Notable case

Miller was one of the district judges in the Little Rock Nine case.

References

Sources
 

1888 births
1981 deaths
People from Stoddard County, Missouri
Southeast Missouri State University alumni
Valparaiso University alumni
University of Kentucky College of Law alumni
People from Searcy, Arkansas
Judges of the United States District Court for the Western District of Arkansas
United States district court judges appointed by Franklin D. Roosevelt
20th-century American judges
Politicians from Fort Smith, Arkansas
Democratic Party United States senators from Arkansas
Democratic Party members of the United States House of Representatives from Arkansas